The 2016 BBC Music Awards took place on 12 December in London at ExCeL London. Two new awards were introduced, the BBC Radio 1 Live Lounge Performance of the Year award and the BBC Radio 2 Album of the Year award. The first winner of the former was The 1975, who performed "What Makes You Beautiful" (originally by One Direction) and the winner of the latter award was Adele for her album 25.

The major winner of the night was Adele who won two awards to the Album of the Year and Song of the Year.

Hosts
The awards were hosted by Fearne Cotton, Claudia Winkleman and Gemma Cairney. Niki & Sammy Albon were backstage hosts.

Performances

Nominations and winners

References

External links
 

BBC Music awards
BBC Music Awards
BBC music awards